Drumlanrig (Scottish Gaelic: Druim Lannraig) is a settlement in Dumfries and Galloway, Scotland, which is best known for nearby Drumlanrig Castle.

The earliest record for Drumlanrig is from 1384, spelled Drumlangryg. There are a number of possible etymologies for the name. It may represent Cumbric drum 'ridge' + -lanerc 'small area of cleared woodland'. However, the first element may also be Gaelic druim 'ridge', either added to a Cumbric name or to Scots *lang-rigg 'long ridge'.

References

External links
Official website for the castle
Google maps place page
tripadvisor.co.uk

Villages in Dumfries and Galloway